Overheating may refer to:
 Overheating (economics), a rapid, very big growth of production that is thought to have a negative influence
 Overheating (electricity), unexpected rise of temperature in a portion of electrical circuit, that can cause harm to the circuit, and accidents
 Overheating (combinatorial game theory), an operation on combinatorial games that approximately reverses the effect of chilling
 Hyperthermia, also called sunstroke, an elevated body temperature due to failed thermoregulation
 Thermal shock, the overheating of a device leading to reduced efficiency, damage or even destruction

See also 
 "Overheated", a song by Billie Eilish from the studio album Happier Than Ever (2021)